This is an episode list for the 1997 TV series, Tenchi in Tokyo (Shin Tenchi Muyo! in Japan). The series is yet, another retelling of the original Tenchi Muyo! Ryo-Ohki OVAs, like the Tenchi Universe TV series. It is produced by AIC and Pioneer LDC. The show aired on TV Tokyo on April 1, 1997 to September 23, 1997. The show was later aired on Cartoon Network's Toonami block from August 25, 2000 to September 29, 2000.

Episode List
{|class="wikitable" width="98%"
|- style="border-bottom: 3px solid #CCF"
! width="30" | # !! Title !! width="150" | Original airdate !! US airdate
|-

|}

Home Media
It was licensed in the US by Pioneer Entertainment who released the series on VHS and DVD until shutting down in 2007.  In 2010, Funimation Entertainment announced that a handful of former Geneon titles were licensed including Tenchi in Tokyo. A complete box set was released on November 13, 2012.

References

1997 Japanese television seasons
Tokyo